One Love is the seventh released album from the Japanese rock band Glay. This album is the first one to have song compositions from each member (except vocalist, Teru).

The single "Global Communication" quickly rose up the charts to the number one spot. It was also the main theme for their 2001 outdoor concert tour, "Glay Expo 2001 Global Communication", and the title for their Fuji Television series, Glay Global Communication. The album peaked at #1 on Oricon charts and sold about 661,460.

Track listing
All lyrics and compositions by Takuro, except for #4, #11 (Lyrics and music by Jiro), #9 and #12 (Music and lyrics by Hisashi), all arrangements by Glay and Masashide Sakuma, except where noted.
 "All Standard Is You" (Arranged by Glay, Masahide Sakuma, and DJ Honda) - 3:21
 "Wet Dream" - 4:14
 "" - 3:36
 "Highway No.5" - 3:11
 "Fighting Spirit" - 5:07
 "" - 6:49
 "Think About My Daughter" - 4:05
 "Viva Viva Viva" - 4:28
 "Prize" - 3:08
 "Mermaid" - 4:10
 "Mister Popcorn" - 3:14
 "" - 2:34
 "Stay Tuned" - 3:35
 "" - 4:07
 "" - 3:38
 "Christmas Ring" - 6:01
 "Global Communication" - 4:13
 "One Love -All Standard Is You Reprise-" (Arranged by Hisashi only) - 2:58

Album chart information
Oricon Top Ranking: #1

References
 Oricon - Glay's profile on the Oricon
 Happy Swing Space Site - Official site

2001 albums
Glay albums
Pony Canyon albums